Lawrence David "Larry" Ackman (April 29, 1939 – May 31, 2022) was an American real estate entrepreneur who led the Ackman-Ziff Real Estate Group, a company founded by his father and uncle. Ackman is noted for playing a role in the development of the mortgage brokerage industry. His son, Bill Ackman is a billionaire hedge-fund mogul.

Early life and education 
Lawrence David Ackman was born on April 29, 1939 in New York City to Herman and Jean (Miller) Ackman. His paternal grandfather, Abraham Ackman immigrated to the United States from Russia in 1887. Ackman was raised in Manhattan and the Bronx; he attended the Riverdale Country School, graduating in 1956. Ackman attended Brown University for his undergraduate studies, majoring in economics. He completed his MBA in finance at Harvard Business School in 1963.

Career 
During his career, Ackman arranged financing for Seymour Durst, Friedland Properties, and Harry Helmsley, among other clients. In the 1990s, Ackman worked to finance the redevelopment of a property on Manhattan's Ninth Avenue, which now houses Chelsea Market.

Ackman became president of the Ackman-Ziff Real Estate Group in 1968 and the company's CEO in 1977.

Personal life 
Ackman sat on the board of the New York Philharmonic and served as Chairman of the Pershing Square Foundation. 

Ackman died on May 31, 2022, at Massachusetts General Hospital.

References 

1939 births
2022 deaths
American real estate businesspeople
People from New York City
Riverdale Country School alumni
Brown University alumni
Harvard Business School alumni